Azure d'Or is the ninth studio album by the English progressive rock band Renaissance, released in May 1979.

Overview
With this album the band stopped using an orchestra, choosing instead to overdub multiple instruments themselves in an attempt to emulate an orchestral sound. It was also the band's first album to exclusively feature short songs with no long "epic" pieces.

"Forever Changing" was the only Renaissance song on which drummer Terry Sullivan wrote all the music. His only other writing credit with the band was on the title track of the preceding album, A Song for All Seasons.

A pre-release track listing, published in the Renaissance Appreciation Society newsletter, included the song "Island of Avalon". This song ended up being omitted from the album; the band members weren't sufficiently pleased with it, having not invested their usual amount of time in it. It was ultimately used as the non-album B-side to "The Winter Tree" in April 1979; it was the only such B-side of the Haslam era of the band. It was released on CD in 1997 on the compilation Songs from Renaissance Days.

Following this album's release, Renaissance underwent major changes that left it with a very uncertain future. In 1980, following a short tour of Israel, both John Tout and Terry Sullivan left the band. Tout (who was dealing with some personal stress due to the death of his sister) had made a major mistake during a concert and walked offstage. After this it was mutually decided that he should leave the band. Terry Sullivan, a longtime friend of Tout's, then left the band as well on principle. On top of all this, the band's label, Warner Brothers/Sire, dropped the group due to disappointing sales of Azure d'Or.

Track listing

Personnel

Renaissance
Annie Haslam – lead (1–2, 4–7, 9, 10) and backing vocals
Michael Dunford – electric guitar (1, 5–6, 8–10), 12 string acoustic guitar (1–2, 4–9), classical guitar (5, 8), mandolin (4), autoharp (5, 10)
John Tout – piano (1–2, 4–7, 9–10), Yamaha CS-80 (1–6, 8–10), Yamaha CS30 (1–2, 6, 8, 10), ARP String Ensemble (1–4, 6–7, 10), ARP Pro Soloist (4–5), ARP 2600 (8), Hammond B3 (8), Yamaha electric piano CP 70 (8), Mellotron (9–10)
Jon Camp – backing and lead (3) vocals, bass (1–2, 4–10), bass pedals (4–10), cello (1), 12 string acoustic guitar (5), electric guitar (6–8)
Terence Sullivan – drums (1–2, 4–10), percussion (1–2, 4, 6–9), timpani (5–6, 10), glockenspiel (5), gong (6), chimes (6, 10), xylophone (10), backing vocals (4)

Production
David Hentschel – producer, engineer
David Bascombe – assistant engineer
Dick Plant – vocals recording
Gered Mankowitz – art direction and photography

References

1979 albums
Renaissance (band) albums
Albums produced by David Hentschel
Sire Records albums
Warner Records albums